Madoka Harada (原田窓香, born December 15, 1985) is a Japanese luger who has competed since 2004. Competing in two Winter Olympics, she earned her best finish of 13th in the women's singles event at Turin in 2006.

Harada's best finish at the FIL World Luge Championships was 19th in the women's singles event at Oberhof in 2008.

References
 2006 luge women's singles results
 FIL-Luge profile
 Les-sports.info profile

External links
 

1985 births
Living people
Japanese female lugers
Olympic lugers of Japan
Lugers at the 2006 Winter Olympics
Lugers at the 2010 Winter Olympics